Reik is the debut eponymous album from Mexican Latin pop group Reik, released on May 24, 2005 through Sony BMG. The album features these singles: "Yo Quisiera", "Qué Vida La Mía", "Noviembre Sin Ti", "Niña" and "Levemente".

Track listing
"Levemente" (Lightly) – 3:57 
"Amor Primero" (First Love) – 3:47 
"Cuando Estás Conmigo" (When You're With Me) – 3:11 
"Qué Vida La Mía" (What A Life Mine Is) – 2:52 
"Vuelve" (Come Back) – 3:18 
"Yo Quisiera" (I Wish) – 3:38 
"Noviembre Sin Ti" (November Without You) – 3:38 
"Niña" (Girl) – 2:52 
"No Sé Si Es Amor" (I Don't Know If It's Love) – 3:09 
"Cada Mañana" (Every Morning) – 3:54 
"Cómo Me Duele" (How It Hurts Me) – 3:18

In popular culture

Other appearances 
The song "Noviembre Sin Ti" is also featured on the compilation album Now Esto Es Musica! Latino, while "Levémente" is featured on Now Esto Es Musica! Latino 2.

Cover versions 
 "Yo Quisiera" was covered by Mexican actor Michael Ronda in Disney Channel Argentine TV series Soy Luna.

Production credits
Kiko Cibrián – arranging, programming, engineering, producer
Abelardo López  Vázquez – arranging, programming, engineering, producer
Mike Harris – engineering
Julian Tydelski – engineering
Manuel Ruiz – engineering
Gabriel Wallach – mastering
Gonzalo Morales – photography

Charts

Weekly charts

Year-end charts

Sales and certifications

References

2005 debut albums
Reik albums
Sony BMG Norte albums